The German American Conference at Harvard (GAC) is a student-led conference organized on a yearly basis since 2008. The conference brings together American and German leaders from business, politics, and academia with students. By building a community of aspiring and established leaders in the United States and Germany, the conference aims at bettering transatlantic relations. According to the German newspaper Handelsblatt the German American conference has developed into an important "transatlantic summit".

Until 2014 the conference was called German Conference at Harvard.

List of Conferences 

There was no conference in 2016 because the conference date was moved from fall 2016 to spring 2017.

Innovation Lounge 
Since 2015 the German American Conference at Harvard features an Innovation Lounge. Participants are given the chance to interact with Startups, Think Tanks and industry leaders from both sides of the Atlantic. The German business weekly WirtschaftsWoche has described this Innovation Lounge as a "Schlaraffenland" for startups.

Former Speakers 
(selection)
 Norbert Lammert, Former president of the German Bundestag
 Frank-Walter Steinmeier, former Vice-Chancellor and Federal Minister of Foreign Affairs 
 Sigmar Gabriel, former Federal Minister of Economic Affairs and Energy of Germany
 Ursula von der Leyen, President of the European Commission, former German Federal Minister of Defense
 Yves Leterme, Secretary-General of the International Institute for Democracy and Electoral Assistance, former Prime Minister of Belgium 
 Wolfgang Ischinger, Chairman of the Munich Security Conference 
 General Wesley Clark
Robert Zoellick, 11th President of the World Bank
General Michael Hayden, Former Director of CIA & NSA
 Frank Mattern, Director of McKinsey & Company and Global Head of Recruiting
 Dr. Miriam Meckel, Chief Editor, WirtschaftsWoche
Thomas Gottschalk, German TV Host and Entertainer
 Dr. Peter Wittig, German Ambassador to the U.S.
Ska Keller, Vice-president and Spokesperson for migration of the Green Group in the European Parliament
Ingo Zamperoni, former U.S. Correspondent of ARD and ARD news anchor
Kai Diekmann, former Chief Editor BILD
Ranga Yogeshwar, German TV Host & Scientist
 Prof. Claudia Kemfert, Head of the department of energy, transportation and environment at the German Institute for Economic Research in Berlin / DIW Berlin
 Stephan Gemkow, CEO Franz Haniel & Cie. GmbH

References

Academic conferences